Lyudvig Alekseyevich Chibirov ( Tseberte Alêksêye fert Lyudvig, ; born November 19, 1932 in Tskhinvali) was the Chairman of the Parliament and later, following inaugural elections the first President of South Ossetia. Born in 1932, Chibirov is a former member of the South Ossetian Parliament. Prior to the elections in 1996, he had been South Ossetia's head of state since 1993. When the post of Chairman of the Parliament was abolished in favor of the presidency, Chibirov became the first occupant of the new office.

During the 1996 elections, he received 65% of the vote compared with former Prime Minister Vladislav Gabaraev, who advocates South Ossetia's secession from the Republic of Georgia and its unification with North Ossetia in Russia, won about 20%. Georgian President Eduard Shevardnadze blasted the elections calling them "unlawful."

In the next elections in 2001, the 69-year-old Chibirov received less than 20% of the votes, while Stanislav Kochiev came in second with 25%, and the 38-year-old Eduard Kokoity (Kokoyev) won with more than 48% of the vote.

References

|-

|-

1932 births
Living people
Ossetian people
Presidents of South Ossetia
People from Tskhinvali
Members of the Parliament of South Ossetia
Recipients of the Order of Friendship (South Ossetia)